Aşağıkuluşağı is a village in the Baskil District of Elazığ Province in Turkey. The village is populated by Kurds of the Zeyve tribe and had a population of 178 in 2021.

The hamlets of Akyazı, Aydınlar, Barış, Beyler, Dikmeli, İskender, Kutuşağı, Memişler and Mollabekir are attached to the village.

References

Villages in Baskil District
Kurdish settlements in Elazığ Province